Mill Creek Township is one of the twenty-two townships of Coshocton County, Ohio, United States. The population as of the 2020 census was 1,032, up from 932 at the previous census.

According to the 2020 "ACS 5-Year Estimates Data Profiles", 37.3% of the township's population spoke only English, while 62.7 spoke an "other [than Spanish] Indo-European language" (basically Pennsylvania German/German).

Geography
Located in the northern part of the county, it borders the following townships:
Mechanic Township, Holmes County - north
Clark Township, Holmes County - northeast corner
Crawford Township - east
White Eyes Township - southeast corner
Keene Township - south
Bethlehem Township - southwest corner
Clark Township - west

No municipalities are located in Mill Creek Township.

Demographics

Name and history
Statewide, other Mill Creek Townships are located in Union and Williams counties and formerly in Hamilton County.

Mill Creek Township was organized in July, 1817.

Government
The township is governed by a three-member board of trustees, who are elected in November of odd-numbered years to a four-year term beginning on the following January 1. Two are elected in the year after the presidential election and one is elected in the year before it. There is also an elected township fiscal officer, who serves a four-year term beginning on April 1 of the year after the election, which is held in November of the year before the presidential election. Vacancies in the fiscal officership or on the board of trustees are filled by the remaining trustees.

References

External links
County website

Townships in Coshocton County, Ohio
Townships in Ohio